Trulli GP (officially Trulli Formula E Team) was a Swiss motor racing team founded by former Formula One driver and Monaco Grand Prix winner Jarno Trulli to compete in the inaugural FIA Formula E Championship for electric cars. The team competed in a technical partnership with Drayson Racing Technologies. It was announced on 1 July 2014 that the team was operating with Super Nova Racing. Trulli announced that he would drive for the team, while later Italian Auto GP driver Michela Cerruti was announced as the second driver for the team.

Role changes
For the 2015 Miami ePrix, Jarno Trulli and Vitantonio Liuzzi became teammates in the lineup. Trulli commented that it was his past driving history that allowed the Trulli Formula E team to even happen in the first place – four months before the first race of the season in China, as a last minute replacement for Drayson's entry on the grid. For the 2015 London ePrix, Liuzzi was replaced by Alex Fontana, as Liuzzi was competing in the GT Asia Series round at Okayama on the same weekend.

Team closure
For the 2015–16 Formula E season, it was announced that Trulli would step back from the racing side of the team, with Salvador Durán partnering Liuzzi. The team did not pass scrutineering for either of the first two races, and folded after the 2015 Putrajaya ePrix.

Results

Notes
  – In the inaugural season, all teams were supplied with a spec powertrain by McLaren.
 † – Driver did not finish the race, but was classified as he completed over 90% of the race distance.
 * – Season still in progress.

References

External links

Swiss auto racing teams
Formula E teams
Auto racing teams established in 2014
2014 establishments in Switzerland
2015 disestablishments in Switzerland

Auto racing teams disestablished in 2015